The Stolen Bride may refer to:

 The Stolen Bride (1913 film), a silent American film directed by Anthony O'Sullivan
 The Stolen Bride (1927 film), a silent American film directed by Alexander Korda